Sabangan, officially the Municipality of Sabangan  is a 5th class municipality in the province of Mountain Province, Philippines. According to the 2020 census, it has a population of 9,621 people.

History

Chico River Dam Project 
Sabangan was one of several municipalities in Mountain Province which would have been flooded by the Chico River Dam Project during the Marcos dictatorship, alongside Bauko, Bontoc, Sadanga, Sagada, and parts of Barlig.  However, the indigenous peoples of Kalinga Province and Mountain Province resisted the project and when hostilities resulted in the murder of Macli-ing Dulag, the project became unpopular and was abandoned before Marcos was ousted by the 1986 People Power Revolution.

Barangays
Sabangan is politically subdivided into 15 barangays.  These barangays are headed by elected officials: Barangay Captain, Barangay Council, whose members are called Barangay Councilors. All are elected every three years.

Climate

Demographics

Economy

Government
Sabangan, belonging to the lone congressional district of the province of Mountain Province, is governed by a mayor designated as its local chief executive and by a municipal council as its legislative body in accordance with the Local Government Code. The mayor, vice mayor, and the councilors are elected directly by the people through an election which is being held every three years.

Elected officials

Members of the Municipal Council (2019–2022):
 Congressman: Maximo Y. Dalog Jr.
 Mayor: Marcial C. Lawilao Jr.
 Vice-Mayor: Dario P. Esden
 Councilors:
 Henrico B. Boguilis
 Celestino A. Matias
 Roger C. Bas-ilen
 Enrique G. Litilit
 Fausto L. Ballakis
 William M. Malamion
 Thomas S. Begnaen
 Crispin P. Altaki

References

External links

 [ Philippine Standard Geographic Code]
Philippine Census Information
Official Website

Municipalities of Mountain Province
Populated places on the Rio Chico de Cagayan